Alfred Körner (14 February 1926 – 23 January 2020) was an Austrian footballer. He played for Austria at the 1948 Summer Olympics.

Club career
Körner had a career with SK Rapid Wien and also played for FK Admira Wien (now VfB Admira Wacker Mödling).

International career
Körner made his debut for Austria in an October 1947 friendly match against Czechoslovakia and played in the 1954 FIFA World Cup where Austria finished third with his older brother Robert, and the 1958 FIFA World Cup. He earned 47 caps, scoring 14 goals. His last international was an October 1958 friendly match against France.

Honours
Austrian Liga (7):
 1946, 1948, 1951, 1952, 1954, 1956, 1957
Austrian Cup (1):
 1946
Zentropa Cup (1):
 1951

References

External links
Profile - Rapid Archive
UEFA On This Day

1926 births
2020 deaths
Austrian footballers
Austria international footballers
Olympic footballers of Austria
Footballers at the 1948 Summer Olympics
1954 FIFA World Cup players
1958 FIFA World Cup players
SK Rapid Wien players
Footballers from Vienna
Austrian football managers
First Vienna FC managers
Association football forwards